Cooling system may refer to: 

 Cooling systems for buildings, part of HVAC technology
 Cooling systems for vehicles, such as internal combustion engine cooling
 Cooling systems for nuclear powerplants, using nuclear reactor coolant
 Cooling systems for computer equipment, see computer cooling